John Christian Rauschner (born 1760) was a German artist who specialized in portraits made of wax. He worked for some time in the United States, travelling to Boston, New York City, Philadelphia and elsewhere. Examples of Rauschner's artwork are in the Albany Institute of History & Art; American Antiquarian Society; Bostonian Society; Fruitlands Museum; Historic New England; Massachusetts Historical Society; Metropolitan Museum of Art, New York; Museum of Fine Arts, Boston; New York Historical Society; Peabody Essex Museum; Philadelphia Museum of Art; West Point Museum; the White House, Washington DC; and Winterthur Museum.

Images
Portraits by Rauschner

References

Further reading

 The Spectator (NY); Date: 12-14-1803. [Anecdote about Mr. Rauschner and his waxworks].
 Ethel Stanwood Bolton, American Wax Portraits, 3rd ed. (Boston: Houghton Mifflin Co., 1929)
 "Wax profiles of Abraham Varick and others by J.C. Rauschner." Antiques, Vol. 30, September 1936, pp. 100–102.
 H.E. Keyes. "More Waxes by Rauschner." Antiques, Vol. 31, April 1937, pp. 186–187.

1760 births
American portrait painters
German portrait painters
German sculptors
German male sculptors
American sculptors
German emigrants to the United States
Year of death missing